Julia Craven Howard (born August 20, 1944) is a  Republican member of the North Carolina General Assembly representing the state's seventy-seventh House district, including constituents in Forsyth and Davie counties.  She is a realtor from Mocksville, North Carolina. She earned her degree from Salem College in two years.

Electoral history

2020

2018

2016

2014

2012

2010

2008

2006

2004

2002

2000

References

|-

|-

|-

Republican Party members of the North Carolina House of Representatives
Women state legislators in North Carolina
Living people
Salem College alumni
People from Mocksville, North Carolina
People from Rowan County, North Carolina
1944 births
21st-century American politicians
21st-century American women politicians